, abbreviated as , is a Japanese light novel series written by Riku Misora and illustrated by Sacraneco. SB Creative published ten volumes between 2015 and 2020 under their GA Bunko imprint. A manga adaptation with art by Kōtarō Yamada was serialized in Square Enix's seinen manga magazine Young Gangan from May 2016 to October 2021. It has been collected in thirteen tankōbon volumes. Both the light novel and manga are licensed in North America by Yen Press. An anime television series adaptation by Project No.9 aired from October 3 to December 19, 2019.

Plot
The series revolves around seven high school students who are internationally renowned for their exceptional abilities. They include Prime Minister Tsukasa Mikogami, genius inventor Ringo Ohoshi, former ninja and journalist Shinobu Sarutobi, world renowned doctor Keine Kanzaki, swordswoman Aoi Ichijo, skilled magician Prince Akatsuki and multi-millionaire Masato Sanada. One day, they survive a plane crash only to find themselves in a medieval fantasy world called Freyjagard.

In this world, two human races live side by side in somewhat of a feudal society: the Byuma, who possess animal features and formidable strength, and the Hyuma, who possess limited magical aptitude. After being rescued by a Byuma named Winona and her adopted Elven daughter Lyrule, the group decides to repay the people of Elm Village by using their advanced skills and knowledge to revolutionize the village and its culture.

The group also learns of an ancient legend, that narrates how an evil dragon was slain by seven heroes who came from another world. Believing that there is a connection between the legend and their present situation, Tsukasa, who is also the leader of the group, directs the others to learn about this new world and also search for any clues that could lead them back to Earth. However, the group's ideas become a threat to the ruling Freyjagard Empire, who promote state atheism and social Darwinist belief that only the strong nobility shall rule and the weak commoners must obey the nobles or suffer punishment. The conflict with the Empire soon leads the Seven Prodigies to create a new nation with equal rights and democracy for the people.

Characters

Tsukasa is a prime minister while still in high school, and because he has been a target of frequent assassination attempts, he is also a very capable fighter. His father was a former prime minister who used corrupted means to provide luxury for the family and held absolute power until Tsukasa disapproved of his actions and exposed his faults, leading to his execution and his mother disowning him. Tsukasa is childhood friends with Masato and Shinobu. Tsukasa chooses to benefit others over himself, family, friends and associates. After conquering the Empire, Tsukasa takes charge of politics to avert foreseen war affairs. He has heterochromia. 

Lyrule is the lead heroine. A beautiful and mysterious elf, she treated the seven prodigies' injuries when they arrived in the other world. She is Winona's adoptive daughter. The villagers intend to keep her secret since the nobles would want her as a concubine. Tsukasa suspects Lyrule might hold the reason for their presence in the world. Lyrule appears to have feelings for Tsukasa. 

Ringo is a very intelligent inventor who is able to invent nuclear reactors that produce practically no radiation on her own. She is usually targeted by criminals who want her capabilities for profit and lives in isolation in outer space. She has a computer companion named Kumausa. Ringo was born out of artificial insemination with her DNA modified, making her rather intelligent from a young age. Ringo was estranged from humanity since her genetic mother, a scientist, was arrested for abusing her out of jealousy, until meeting Tsukasa in middle school who gave her a reason to live.

Shinobu is a descendant of ninjas and a top journalist who is able to uncover any scoop and information. Her ancestor is Sarutobi Sasuke. She tends to manipulate her opponents through her charms. She seems to dote on Elch.

Keine is the most miraculous doctor in the world, so much so that she can even cure latent cancer. Her patients have never died in her hands. Her knowledge to produce medicine from coal or tar rivals those using elixirs. She can also defend herself from foes by injecting them with anesthesia. Keine is beautiful, gorgeous even, but her looks hide a psychotic mind. She despises how easily the human body succumbs to sickness, and curses God for creating weak beings, declaring her desire to kill God. At one point, Keine tries to give Ringo a drug so she can use it to basically rape Tsukasa and doesn’t see a problem with that behavior. She also lobotomizes Count Celenteus with a saw, in order to reform him into an honest doctor.

Aoi is a swordswoman wielding a katana. Her physical abilities are so immense that she is proven to solely defeat entire armies of terrorists; a monstrous lord, and maneuver a missile physically. She and Keine went to the same middle school together. Her katana is actually cursed, but is the only one in existence she can wield without breaking it due to her immense strength; the curse itself has to redirect to keeping the katana from breaking.

Akatsuki is the best magician ever, capable of levitation; smokescreen; and making big monuments such as the Statue of Liberty, or even mountains, vanish. He is often mistaken for a girl due to his feminine figure. Tsukasa forces Akatsuki to pose as a god to persuade civilians that change is indeed possible.

Masato is the most successful businessman in the world while still in high school. He has rescued industries from near bankruptcy. His multi-listening ability allows him to fathom people's movement. He has a thing for Winona despite her already being a mother. He got the Neutscheland Company on edge forcing them not to go cheap. After increasing finances to survive the winter when setting up a successful trading company in the other world, Masato took in Roo as his apprentice.

Elch's mother and Lyrule's adoptive mother. She was her village's top hunter before settling down. 

Winona's son. He acts as the treasurer of his village and often means to go straightforward in protecting its position and people. Elch hates the nobles because of their greed and bad treatment of the commoners. After handling Masato's success in permitting money business and Tsukasa's proclamation to usurp the empire, Elch gains more confidence.

An escaped slave who pleaded Masato to take her in after seeing his strong determination. Roo hopes to one day reunite with her parents while becoming a brilliant money-maker. Her math needs work, since she can only do it while thinking of "shinies".

A lady knight whom Shinobu befriends after witnessing her bravery in saving a child despite being an outsider. Jeanne is a member of the Azure Brigade, a group of reformist nobles within the Empire who want to change the Empire to ensure the commoners are treated well and not like animals. Jeanne and Shinobu team up to confront Gustav and his despotism. She is the only one of the Azure Brigade to not be greedy and truly think of the people.

 Also known as "Duke Fastidious", Gustav was a mage who gained recognition during the Freyjagard Empire's war with the Yamato Empire and was granted the title of Duke and lands to rule. Despite being a powerful mage, Gustav is revealed to be a horrible ruler where he confiscated money and starves his people to build statues and towns as a sign of his devotion to the Emperor, not caring that many people died or forced themselves into cannibalism just to survive. He is madly loyal to the Emperor to the point that he considers any slights to be a major offense that deserves death. Due to his poor leadership skills where he sent his army to crush the Seven-Light Faith despite lacking winter gear, his army is defeated by the better-armed and prepared army of the Seven-Light faith, allowing the Azure Brigade to attack his castle unopposed.

Media

Light novels
The novels were written by Riku Misora and illustrated by Sacraneco. Ten volumes were published by SB Creative under their GA Bunko imprint between October 2015 and February 2020.

Manga

Anime
An anime television series adaptation was announced by GA Bunko on March 13, 2019. The series is animated by Project No.9 and directed by Shinsuke Yanagi, with Deko Akao handling series composition, and Akane Yano designing the characters. Hiromi Mizutani is composing the series' music. It aired from October 3 to December 19, 2019, on Tokyo MX, AT-X, and BS Fuji. Dialogue+ performed the series' opening theme song "Hajimete no Kakumei", while Akari Kitō performed the series' ending theme song "dear my distance." Crunchyroll has licensed the series with an English dub had been produced.

Reception

Previews
The anime adaptation's first episode garnered poor reviews from Anime News Network's staff during the Fall 2019 season previews. Rebecca Silverman felt the adaptation was indistinguishable compared to previous isekai shows and contained numerous plot holes and fanservice moments. Theron Martin commended the production merits of the episode and was intrigued by what the main cast will bring moving forward but was critical of the overall setup having holes and straining credibility. Nick Creamer felt the setup of the premise was generically explained and lacked organic storytelling, didn't reveal more about its characters, and had "middling animation and art design" throughout its production. Despite giving praise to the visuals and finding some likable characters, Lynzee Loveridge was put off by the various "plot conveniences" that the main savants easily sidestep with their abilities. The fifth reviewer, James Beckett, gave credit to the "technical qualities" for being decent and consistent that displays "genuine care" throughout the show, but criticized it for being "a bargain-bin isekai light novel adaptation" with "blandly competent" and overly perfect protagonists ripped straight from the Danganronpa blueprint, concluding that: "There are so many isekai coming out this fall, and even the bad ones we've gotten so far are more interesting and worthwhile than this. I'll take the dumb show about the butthole sniffing pet maniac over whatever this flavorless gruel is any day."

Series reception
Martin reviewed the complete anime series in 2020 and gave it a C+ grade. He praised the overall isekai setup and plot progression to involve each of the seven protagonists (singling out Tsukasa for having an engaging character), but felt it made leaps in logic when explaining its cast's abilities and "situational contrivances" they solve effortlessly, the world setting not being well explained and character development not being shared amongst its ensemble, concluding that: "On the whole, High School Prodigies Have It Easy Even in Another World has some legitimate entertainment value and a few interesting aspects, especially if you can just turn your mind off and roll with the premise. However, what variety it offers isn't enough to make it memorable or merit recommendation beyond dedicated isekai fans."

Gadget Tsūshin listed Mayotarō (a fan nickname for Tsukasa Mikogami referring to the first episode mayonnaise) in their 2019 anime buzzwords list.

See also
 Chivalry of a Failed Knight – Another light novel series by the same author

Explanatory notes

References

External links
  
  
 

2019 anime television series debuts
2015 Japanese novels
Anime and manga based on light novels
Crunchyroll anime
Fictional child prodigies
GA Bunko
Gangan Comics manga
Isekai anime and manga
Isekai novels and light novels
Japanese fantasy novels
Light novels
Muse Communication
Project No.9
Seinen manga
Yen Press titles